Mariya Dmitriyenko (born 24 March 1988) is a Kazakh sports shooter. She competed in the women's trap event at the 2016 Summer Olympics.

In March 2012, she won the Amir of Kuwait International Shooting Grand Prix, but at the award ceremony, the parody national anthem from the 2006 film Borat was mistakenly played instead of the real Kazakh national anthem. The team complained, and the award ceremony was restaged. The incident apparently resulted from the wrong song being downloaded from the Internet.

References

External links
 

1988 births
Living people
Kazakhstani female sport shooters
Olympic shooters of Kazakhstan
Shooters at the 2016 Summer Olympics
Place of birth missing (living people)
Universiade medalists in shooting
Asian Games medalists in shooting
Asian Games gold medalists for Kazakhstan
Asian Games bronze medalists for Kazakhstan
Shooters at the 2006 Asian Games
Shooters at the 2010 Asian Games
Shooters at the 2014 Asian Games
Shooters at the 2018 Asian Games
Medalists at the 2014 Asian Games
Medalists at the 2018 Asian Games
Universiade silver medalists for Kazakhstan
Medalists at the 2011 Summer Universiade
21st-century Kazakhstani women